"Wilson's Heart" is the sixteenth episode and season finale of the fourth season of House and the eighty-sixth episode overall. It aired on May 19, 2008, on Fox. It is the second and final part of the two-part fourth season finale, the first part being "House's Head".

Plot
In the second part of the two-part season finale, House remains affected by injuries sustained in a bus crash that has also left Amber Volakis rapidly deteriorating from a mysterious condition. Clues inside House's head hold the key to Amber's condition, and House's friendship with Wilson is tested as murky memories from the bus accident threaten to change their lives forever.

The episode begins with House and Wilson at Princeton General Hospital, where the eight overflow victims of the bus crash that weren't taken to Princeton-Plainsboro ended up being taken, including Amber, who up until now was only known as Jane Doe #2 due to a lack of ID on her. The attending physician at Princeton General cannot explain Amber's sudden onset tachycardia, but explains that whatever is causing this condition isn't from the bus crash. House demands that she be moved via ambulance to Princeton-Plainsboro, which the attending initially refuses, until House says that her "husband" Wilson can demand she be moved, which Wilson does.

While being moved via the ambulance, Amber's tachycardia degenerates into v-fib. House goes to shock Amber to stabilize her heart, but Wilson demands he stop and put her into protective hypothermia. He tells House that if he restarts her heart now, it will keep racing, shoot off free radicals, and kill her brain. In an attempt to buy more time for a proper diagnosis, Wilson figures protective hypothermia along with dialysis is her best option. House agrees; however, during the further testing that follows, Amber develops multisystem organ failure, including liver and neurological damage.

In an attempt to remember exactly what he saw that caused his initial concern and help definitively diagnosis Amber, House decides to undergo deep brain stimulation at Wilson's urging, with House asking Wilson if he is willing to risk House's life in the process and Wilson reluctantly answering affirmatively. During the stimulation, he recalls the symptom which presented in Amber before the bus crash. House also remembers the events that led up to him and Amber being on the bus to begin with: he got drunk at Sharrie's bar, and the bartender (Fred Durst) took his keys away, so House called Wilson for a ride, but he was on call so Amber came instead. House angrily stormed off after Amber wouldn't drink with him, and boarded a bus. Amber followed him to give him his cane, which he had forgotten as he left her to pay his tab at the bar.

House recalls that, during the bus ride, Amber sneezed, reached for a Kleenex, and complained that she had the flu. He then recalls what caused his concern; after she wiped her nose, she reached into her purse and pulled out prescription pills, which turned out to be amantadine. She took a heavy dose of two or three amantadine pills, right as the garbage truck plowed into the bus. The crash caused such extensive anatomical and physiological trauma (especially the blood loss and shock from her leg injury) that she ended up suffering from acute kidney failure. This damage to her kidneys made them unable to adequately filter out the amantadine, causing her to overdose and thus causing injury to her organs and all of her unexplained symptoms. Wilson suggests dialysis as a treatment, but House tells him that unfiltered amantadine binds to the proteins in the body; therefore, it is too late for dialysis. House and Wilson begin to cry, and House goes into a seizure while still connected to the deep brain stimulation equipment. The seizure makes the equipment shift, causing House's brain to bleed, leading to him falling into a coma.

The team confirms House's diagnosis of Amber. With all of her organs damaged, she is unable to qualify for a heart transplant, and so there is nothing they can do to treat her, with Foreman noting that as soon as her heart degenerated into v-fib, there was nothing anyone could do. Wilson weans Amber off anesthesia in order to spend her last moments alive with him. The team comes in one by one to say goodbye to Amber, and after Wilson himself says goodbye, he shuts off Amber's bypass and she dies peacefully in Wilson's arms. An unconscious House has a vision of Amber, who persuades him not to give up on life and die, telling him, "You can't always get what you want."

Back at the hospital, Thirteen discovers she has inherited Huntington's disease, and House awakens with Cuddy at his side. Taub crawls into bed with his wife, Kutner watches TV alone, and Chase and Cameron meet Foreman in a restaurant. Wilson visits House, but the two just silently stare at each other as House awakens. Wilson returns home and finds the note Amber left him in their bedroom saying she went to pick up House, causing him to break down in tears. House lies awake in his hospital bed, staring blankly into space with a sleeping Cuddy holding his hand.

Reception
The episode increased ratings from the previous week, with 16.358 million viewers tuning in.

Soundtrack
An acoustic version of Massive Attack's "Teardrop," the show's opening theme, can be heard in the middle of the episode in a short montage, by José González.

The song "Re:Stacks" by Bon Iver is used during Amber and Wilson's final moments together.

The song that plays near the end of the episode when House and Amber are on the bus is "Light for the Deadvine" by People in Planes.

The song that plays as House exits the bus until the end of the episode is "Passing Afternoon" by Iron and Wine.

External links

Notes

House (season 4) episodes
2008 American television episodes

fr:… Dans le cœur de Wilson
it:Episodi di Dr. House - Medical Division (quarta stagione)#Il cuore di Wilson